The 2002 Masters Tournament was the 66th Masters Tournament, held April 11–14 at Augusta National Golf Club. Tiger Woods won his third Masters, and second consecutive, with a score of 276 (−12), three strokes ahead of runner-up Retief Goosen. It was only the third successful defense of a Masters title, previously accomplished in 1966 by Jack Nicklaus and 1990 by Nick Faldo.

Course

Field
1. Masters champions
Tommy Aaron, Seve Ballesteros, Charles Coody, Fred Couples, Ben Crenshaw, Nick Faldo, Raymond Floyd, Bernhard Langer (10,13,14,16,17), Sandy Lyle, Larry Mize, José María Olazábal (10,16,17), Mark O'Meara (3), Arnold Palmer, Gary Player, Vijay Singh (4,11,14,16,17), Craig Stadler, Tom Watson, Tiger Woods (2,3,4,5,14,16,17), Ian Woosnam (13), Fuzzy Zoeller
George Archer, Gay Brewer, Jack Burke Jr., Billy Casper, Doug Ford, Bob Goalby, Herman Keiser, Byron Nelson, Jack Nicklaus, and Sam Snead did not play.

2. U.S. Open champions (last five years)
Ernie Els (10,13,14,16,17), Retief Goosen (16,17), Lee Janzen

3. The Open champions (last five years)
David Duval (10,14,16,17), Paul Lawrie, Justin Leonard (14,16,17)

4. PGA champions (last five years)
Davis Love III (11,14,16,17), David Toms (14,16,17)

5. The Players Championship winners (last three years)
Craig Perks
Hal Sutton (14,16,17) withdrew with a pulled muscle on the first morning of the tournament.

6. U.S. Amateur champion and runner-up
Bubba Dickerson (a), Robert Hamilton (a)

7. The Amateur champion
Michael Hoey (a)

8. U.S. Amateur Public Links champion
Chez Reavie (a)

9. U.S. Mid-Amateur champion
Tim Jackson (a)

10. Top 16 players and ties from the 2001 Masters
Paul Azinger (11,14,16,17), Ángel Cabrera (11,16,17), Mark Calcavecchia (12,14,16,17), Chris DiMarco (14,15,16,17), Brad Faxon (14,15,16,17), Jim Furyk (14,16,17), Toshimitsu Izawa (16,17), Miguel Ángel Jiménez (13), Rocco Mediate (11,14,16,17), Phil Mickelson (11,12,14,16,17), Steve Stricker (14,16), Kirk Triplett (11,14,16,17)

11. Top eight players and ties from the 2001 U.S. Open
Mark Brooks, Stewart Cink (14,16,17), Tom Kite

12. Top four players and ties from 2001 PGA Championship
Shingo Katayama (16,17), Steve Lowery (14,16)

13. Top four players and ties from the 2001 Open Championship
Darren Clarke (16,17), Niclas Fasth (16,17), Billy Mayfair (14)

14. Top 40 players from the 2001 PGA Tour money list
Robert Allenby (16,17), Billy Andrade, José Cóceres (16,17), Joe Durant (16,17), Bob Estes (16,17), Sergio García (16,17), Scott Hoch (16,17), Jerry Kelly (17), Tom Lehman (16,17), Frank Lickliter (16), Shigeki Maruyama, Scott McCarron (17), Jesper Parnevik (16,17), Tom Pernice Jr., Kenny Perry (16,17), Jeff Sluman, Kevin Sutherland (15,17), Scott Verplank (16,17), Mike Weir (16,17)

15. Top 3 players from the 2002 PGA Tour money list on March 10

16. Top 50 players from the final 2001 world ranking
Stuart Appleby, Thomas Bjørn (17), Michael Campbell (17), Pádraig Harrington (17), Charles Howell III (17), Paul McGinley (17), Colin Montgomerie (17), Nick Price (17), Adam Scott, Toru Taniguchi, Lee Westwood (17)

17. Top 50 players from world ranking published March 10
John Daly, Matt Kuchar, Rory Sabbatini

18. Special foreign invitation
Greg Norman

All the amateurs except Tim Jackson were playing in their first Masters, as were Niclas Fasth, Charles Howell III, Jerry Kelly, Paul McGinley, Craig Perks, Adam Scott, Kevin Sutherland, and Toru Taniguchi.

Round summaries

First round
Thursday, April 11, 2002

Davis Love III, the 1997 PGA Championship winner, rolled out to the first round lead with a five-under 67. Sergio García who had little success prior to this year at the Masters, shot a four-under 68 to place him in a tie for second with Ángel Cabrera. 2001 U.S. Open champion, Retief Goosen, shot a three-under 69 to place him in a tie with Phil Mickelson and Pádraig Harrington for fourth. There was a massive eleven-way tie at -2 for seventh after the first round. Most notably in this group was two-time and defending Masters champion, Tiger Woods. This group saw two other Masters champions in Vijay Singh and José María Olazábal. Four others were in red figures at -1 with Greg Norman headlining that group.

Second round
Friday, April 12, 2002
Saturday, April 13, 2002

Vijay Singh, the 2000 champion, headlined the second round with a dominant, seven-under 65 to bolt up to the top of the leaderboard at −9. The Fijian was not the only impressive player on the day, as four players shot five-under 67s, including Retief Goosen who moved into second at −8 and Ernie Els who moved into third at −7. Three-time Masters champion, Nick Faldo, also was among those who posted a 67. Tiger Woods headlined the five players tied for fourth at −5. Woods shot a three-under 69 to place him four strokes off the lead heading to the weekend. Also in this group was two-time champion José María Olazábal. Phil Mickelson was among the four players tied for ninth at −3. Because of the good deal of low scoring, the cut was set at +3, and Jim Furyk and David Duval headlined the list of notables to fail to make the weekend. Second round play was suspended due to weather and 38 golfers had to complete it Saturday morning.

Amateurs: Hoey (+4), Dickerson (+6), Hamilton (+10), Jackson (+10), Reavie (+16).

Third round
Saturday, April 13, 2002

The defending champion, Tiger Woods, charged to a tie for the lead with a six-under 66 to move to -11. Woods, looking for his seventh major championship, was 6-0 going into the final round of a major championship with at least a share of the lead. South African Retief Goosen shot a three-under 69 to move from second place at the beginning of the day to a tie with Woods for the 54-hole lead. Vijay Singh shot a disappointing par 72 after his 65 in the second round to remain at -9 and in third place all by himself. Phil Mickelson charged up the leaderboard with a four-under 68 into a tie for fourth with Ernie Els and Sergio García. José María Olazábal shot a one-under 71 to move to -6 and sole ownership of seventh place. Two Europeans (Pádraig Harrington, Thomas Bjørn) sat six shots behind the lead in a tie for eighth at -5. Because the second round had to be completed Saturday morning, third round play began with golfers teeing off from the 1st and 10th holes to ensure the round would be completed by night fall.

Final round 
Sunday, April 14, 2002

Summary
For the first time since Nick Faldo in 1990, a defending Masters champion successfully defended his title. Tiger Woods captured his third green jacket and seventh overall major championship with a one-under 71 to complete his tournament at -12. This was only the third time in Masters history that a player won back-to-back titles (Jack Nicklaus 1965–66, Faldo 1989–90). Woods set yet another Masters record for the best score by a golfer defending his championship.

Woods was not threatened during the final round as his 54-hole co-leader, Retief Goosen, shot a two-over 74 to fall to -9 and a second-place finish. Phil Mickelson, José María Olazábal, and Pádraig Harrington all shot one-under 71s to finish third, fourth, and tied for fifth respectively. Ernie Els and Vijay Singh spoiled great first and second rounds with scores over par in the final round. Els shot a one-over 73 to tie for fifth, and Singh shot a four-over 76 to finish in seventh. Sergio García had his best Masters finish in eighth place at -4. Overall, the scoring was much more difficult during the final round than it was in the other three rounds. The only score below 70 was by Shigeki Maruyama, who shot a five-under 67 to finish -1 for the tournament and a tie for 14th place.

Final leaderboard

Scorecard

Cumulative tournament scores, relative to par
{|class="wikitable" span = 50 style="font-size:85%;
|-
|style="background: Pink;" width=10|
|Birdie
|style="background: PaleGreen;" width=10|
|Bogey
|style="background: Green;" width=10|
|Double bogey
|style="background: Olive;" width=10|
|Triple bogey+ 
|}
Cumulative tournament scores, relative to par
Source:

References

External links
Coverage on the European Tour's official site

2002
2002 in golf
2002 in American sports
2002 in sports in Georgia (U.S. state)
April 2002 sports events in the United States